The 2015–16 Somali First Division is the 43rd season of top-tier football in Somalia. The season began on 28 December 2015 and concluded on 15 May 2016. Benadir SC was atop the table nearly the entire season to win their sixth league title.

The league is comprised 10 teams, the bottom two of which - Sahafi and Mogadishu City - will be relegated to the 2016-17 Somali Second Division.

Teams
A total of 10 teams will contest the league, including eight sides from the 2014–15 season and two promoted from the 2014–15 Somali Second Division, Mogadishu City and Singjet FC.
On the other hand, Somali Fruit and Savana FC were the last two teams of the 2014–15 season and will play in Second Division for the 2015-16 season. Heegan FC are the defending champions from the 2014–15 season.

League table

Positions by round

References

Football leagues in Somalia
Foo
Foo
Somalia